Apollon Athienou was a Cypriot football club based in Athienou. The team was playing sometimes in Second and in Third Division. In 1972 merged with Othellos Athienou F.C. keeping the name Othellos.

References

Association football clubs disestablished in 1972
Defunct football clubs in Cyprus
1972 disestablishments in Cyprus